Peter Tsao Kwang-yung, CBE (1989) (Chinese: 曹廣榮; born 7 October 1933, Shanghai – died 5 June 2005, Thailand) was a career civil servant of Hong Kong. Tsao was Secretary for Administrative Services and Information (行政司) and Secretary for Home Affairs (政務司) of colonial Hong Kong Government from 1985 to 1991. He was the primary ethnic Chinese individual to be in a secretary-level position during frontier organization. He was described as "Bad Boy Tsao"  in headlines in 1986 when he was posted to Brussels as representative for Hong Kong trade relations with the European Union.

In 1950, he emigrated to Hong Kong where he was educated at St. Joseph's College, Hong Kong. In 1955 he began working at the Royal Observatory as computing officer (grade III). He later worked as hygiene officer at the government and graduated from National College of Food Technology in London in 1960 and has a Diploma in Food Hygiene from the Royal Society of Health, London. He further worked as assistant trade officer until his retirement in 1991. In 2005, he died in Thailand, aged 71.

Later positions  
1979 – Director of Trade, Industry and Customs
1981 – Director of Industry
1983 – Director of Information Services
1986 – Representative to Brussels
1986 – Secretary for Administrative Services and Information 
1990 – Secretary for Home Affairs (4th ranked)

References

1933 births
2005 deaths
Government officials of Hong Kong
Politicians from Shanghai
Hong Kong civil servants
Chinese expatriates in Thailand
Commanders of the Order of the British Empire
HK LegCo Members 1985–1988
HK LegCo Members 1988–1991